Pascal Duquenne (born 8 August 1970) is a Belgian actor. He shared the Best Actor Award in the 1996 Cannes Film Festival for his performance as Georges in the movie The Eighth Day, with Daniel Auteuil, who played Harry. He lives in Brussels. He has Down syndrome.
In 2004, he received the very high civil distinction of Commander in the Order of the Crown (Belgium).

Films 
 Toto le héros, 1991 (minor part)
 Le Huitième Jour (The Eighth Day), 1996 (lead role)
 Lumière et compagnie, 1996 (supporting role)
 The Room by Giles Daoust, 2006 (lead role)
 Mr. Nobody, 2009 (supporting role)
 The Brand New Testament, 2015 (supporting role)

All these movies are directed by Jaco Van Dormael, and they are close to each other.

TV series
 Le commissaire Moulin, 2004

References

External links
 

1970 births
Living people
Actors with Down syndrome
Belgian male film actors
Cannes Film Festival Award for Best Actor winners
Commanders of the Order of the Crown (Belgium)
Belgian male television actors
People from Vilvoorde
20th-century Belgian male actors
21st-century Belgian male actors